André Herrero (born January 28, 1938) is a former rugby union player. He played for the French Rugby team as a flanker. Herrero is of Spanish descent.

Career

Club 
 RC Toulonnais. He reached the French championship finals in 1968 and 1971 and won the Challenge Yves du Manoir in 1970.
 RRC Nice

National squad
 He played his first game with the French team on December 15, 1963, against Romania, and his last in 1967 againstRomania.
 He had 22 caps for France between 1963 and 1967.
 Five Nations championship: he won the 1967 edition.

External links
Player profile at Scrum.com

References

1938 births
Living people
French rugby union players
French people of Spanish descent
RC Toulonnais players
Rugby Nice Côte d'Azur players
France international rugby union players
Rugby union number eights